Isidor Sârbu, also known as Sîrbu (1887 – 1980), was a victim of dekulakization in the Moldavian Autonomous Soviet Socialist Republic (MASSR). Of Romanian heritage, Sârbu was born a citizen of the Russian Empire in Corjova, where he spent some fifty years of his life. Before the October Revolution, he had amassed a relatively large agricultural estate and was employing farmhands, leading him to be designated a kulak. Politically and socially marginalized by the MASSR, he sold most of his properties before the land collectivization of 1930. Sârbu was allowed to join the collective farm, and became one of its managers, but in 1933 lost his position and found himself arrested by the OGPU. He received a suspended sentence for theft, was stripped of his remaining property, and then reduced to supporting his wife and eight children as a day laborer.

In 1935, the NKVD engineered Sârbu's forced resettlement to Pervomaisk, separating him from his children. He was arrested after his clandestine return to Corjova, in 1936, and sentenced to a prison term in Tiraspol; in 1937, he broke the terms of his parole and was rearrested, along with his wife Tatiana. They returned to Corjova in 1940, shortly before Romania occupied the region. Narrowly escaping execution by the NKVD, Sârbu welcomed the Romanian-established Transnistria Governorate, which appointed him Mayor of Corjova. He fled to Romania in early 1944, leaving most of his family behind. Sârbu lived in his adoptive country at Brezoaele, becoming noted for his criticism of the Romanian communist regime. His descendants in modern-day Moldova include Vladimir Voronin, who became chairman of the Party of Communists and served terms as President of Moldova. His connections to Sârbu, first exposed publicly in the early 2010s, have remained a topic of controversy.

Biography
Isidor Sârbu, described in some sources as a "full-blooded Romanian" or "great Romanian", was born in 1887 in the village of Corjova, then part of the Russian Kherson Governorate—and on the Dniester-marked border with Bessarabia Governorate. According to records of his interrogation, he was from a peasant family that, at one point, comprised eleven individuals; he had five sisters and four brothers. He married and established his own farm in 1904, interrupting his agricultural life to perform his service in the Imperial Russian Army, at Chișinău (1905–1909); he was again called under arms during World War I, serving for its entire duration with the Romanian Front. By 1917, his farm stretched over 40 hectares, in addition to which he leased 10–15 hectares; he owned two houses, some ten cows, and 25 sheep, and employed three or four seasonal farmhands. He and his wife Tatiana Negrea had eight living children by 1933; the oldest was a daughter, Olga, born in 1915 or 1916.

Shortly after the war, Bessarabia united with Romania, leaving Corjova on Romania's border with what became in 1922 the Soviet Union; the MASSR was organized on that border territory in 1924. Little is recorded of Sârbu's life during the October Revolution and the Ukrainian Civil War, down to the New Economic Policy of the late 1920s. Branded a kulak by the MASSR government, he had no voting rights in Soviet elections, down to 1928, when he was enfranchised as a serednyak (middle-income peasant). He had by then sold or distributed his property—holding on to just eight hectares of farmland and twelve sheep—, but was regarded as a speculator, and continued to pay a large share of his income in punitive taxes. This period was followed by the collectivization of 1930. During the latter event Sârbu was recorded by MASSR officials as almost a kulak, but opted to enter Corjova's collective farm, possibly for fear of deportation to Siberia. He managed to earn the respect of his peers, being selected as one of the farm's administrators. Despite his efforts at integration, Sârbu targeted by the dekulakization campaign of 1932. Initially prosecuted for theft of collective property in August 1932 (he and one of his sons, Marcu, allegedly burned down some of the crops), he was excluded from the collective farm in February 1933; in April, the OGPU arrested Isidor and Tatiana Sârbu. A tribunal found the evidence against Isidor inconclusive, and he received a suspended sentence.

Sârbu himself reported that the OGPU had confiscated and sold his house in March 1933, leaving the family to bunk into a room in Corjova, rented to them by Dumitru Halippa. This situation lasted to 1934, when the Sârbus moved to the neighboring city, Dubăsari, where Isidor worked two jobs—as a vintager and as a brickmaker. The NKVD intervened in April 1935, ordering that Isidor and his brother Simion (who had returned from a Gulag), along with three other men, be resettled away from the Romanian border. Isidor and Tatiana moved inland to Pervomaisk, leaving their children in the care of relatives from the Dubăsari area; upon arrival, Sârbu was rewarded with his first Soviet passport. Unable to provide for his family, he ignored NKVD orders and returned to Corjova that June, bunking with his brother-in-law Serghei Șpac. The Militsiya withdrew his passport, warning him that he should return to Pervomaisk. Sârbu continued to defy the authorities, and was again arrested in January 1936. 

On January 14, the NKVD commandants of the MASSR sentenced Sârbu to three years in a penal facility at Tiraspol; a model prisoner, he was paroled on April 29—only his interdiction to live in Romanian border was still upheld, for another three years. For a while, he was in the South Caucasus as a day laborer. He fell ill and was again forced by his circumstances to ignore the terms of his release, returning to Corjova in 1937. Arrested by the Militsiya on October 26, 1937, he was released, then rearrested together with his wife on January 26, 1938. The two were ordered to serve terms at the NKVD-run facility in Kherson; Tatiana was sentenced to a one-year term, while Isidor had to serve his remaining two years. Their teen-aged daughter, Olga, was shocked by these news, which, as Sârbu himself noted, contributed to her death in May 1938.

Both Isidor and Tatiana had returned to Corjova in January 1940, some months ahead of the Soviet incursion into Bessarabia, which brought Corjova and Dubăsari into the new Moldavian Soviet Socialist Republic. The following year saw the disestablishment of Soviet rule, with Operation Barbarossa—as a participant in this attack, Romania gained control of both Bessarabia and the former MASSR, establishing a semi-autonomous "Transnistria Governorate". During the Soviet withdrawal, Sârbu narrowly avoided being apprehended and executed by the NKVD: though his name was on the kill-list, he hid with his father-in-law, Toader Negrea, until the Romanian Army entered Corjova. Sârbu was appointed Corjova Mayor, and gave an interview about his life for a Romanian magazine (April 1943). For the latter event, he was reportedly in the Romanian capital, Bucharest.

Sârbu's newfound status lasted only until the Soviet reoccupation of 1944. Ahead of this defeat, Sârbu and his daughter Domnica took refuge in Romania; Tatiana and the couple's other children opted to stay in Corjova. As noted by historian Ion Varta, he petitioned the Romanian authorities not to extradite him, "allow[ing] him to live in Romania". Except for an enrollment with the anti-communist resistance in the Oaș Mountains, Isidor lived the rest of his life in Dâmbovița County, at Brezoaele. According to oral tradition, he tried to warn locals about the emergence of a Romanian communist regime and the introduction of collectivization to Romania. He died in 1980, and is buried in Brezoaele next to Domnica, who died in 2004.

Legacy
Sârbu achieved posthumous fame as the maternal grandfather of Vladimir Voronin (born to Isidor's daughter Pelaghia). Voronin began his political career with the Communist Party of Moldavia in the 1960s, when he reportedly abjured the Sârbus; according to Ion Costaș, of the Democratic Forum of Romanians in Moldova, it still remains unexplained "how someone with this biographical record could be promoted within the Soviet Union". His ascent continued in post-Soviet Moldova, when he became leader of the Party of Communists, serving as national president in 2001–2009. The story first broke in March 2002, when Gheorghe Budeanu published in Timpul an article asking that Voronin either confirm or deny his connection with Brezoaele. His successor as President, Mihai Ghimpu, ordered the dossiers of Soviet political prisoners to be declassified in 2010, which allowed public access to Sârbu's biographical records.

In 2012, Voronin discussed his family history with journalist Lorena Bogza of ProTV Chișinău. He "admitted to being Isidor Sârbu's grandson, but denied that the latter had been an anti-communist, or that he had taken refuge to Romania of his own will. [Voronin] claimed that his grandfather wished to make his return to Corjova in 1945, but that he had been labeled a traitor by the Soviets, and only in that context did he prefer to stay in Romania." More in detail, Voronin argued that Sârbu had been sent to Romania with crates of ordnance, and denied that the family had ever been wealthy, other than owning a cart and horses. He also recounted having once met Domnica. Voronin left open the issue of his ethnic background, prompting journalists to argue that his ancestry may be entirely Romanian.

Notes

References
Igor Cașu, Dușmanul de clasă. Represiuni politice, violență și rezistență în R(A)SS Moldovenească, 1924‒1956. Chișinău: Editura Cartier, 2014. 
Ion Costaș, Transnistria, 1989–1992: Cronica unui război "nedeclarat". Bucharest: RAO Publishing, 2012.  

1887 births
1980 deaths
People of the Moldavian Autonomous Soviet Socialist Republic
Political office-holders in Transnistria Governorate
Mayors of places in Moldova
Mayors of places in Romania
Moldovan anti-communists
Members of the Romanian anti-communist resistance movement
Soviet internal exiles
Moldovan exiles
Moldovan prisoners and detainees
Soviet prisoners and detainees
Prisoners and detainees of Moldova
Prisoners and detainees of the Soviet Union
People from Corjova, Dubăsari
Moldovan people of Romanian descent
Romanian people of Moldovan descent
Romanian farmers
Russian military personnel of World War I
Ukrainian cooperative organizers
Brickmakers
Romanian refugees
World War II refugees
Naturalised citizens of Romania